Michał Płotka (born 11 June 1988 in Puck) is a Polish former professional footballer who played as a defender. He last played for Znicz Pruszków, and has previously played in Ekstraklasa for Arka Gdynia and Widzew Łódź.

External links 
 

1988 births
Living people
People from Puck, Poland
Sportspeople from Pomeranian Voivodeship
Polish footballers
Poland under-21 international footballers
Association football defenders
Arka Gdynia players
Motor Lublin players
Warta Poznań players
Widzew Łódź players
Znicz Pruszków players
Ekstraklasa players
II liga players